Karl-Richard Frey (born 11 July 1991) is a German judoka. He competed at the 2016 Summer Olympics in Rio de Janeiro, in the men's 100 kg. He finished in 5th place after losing to Cyrille Maret of France in the bronze medal match.

References

External links

1991 births
Living people
German male judoka
Olympic judoka of Germany
Judoka at the 2016 Summer Olympics
People from Troisdorf
Sportspeople from Cologne (region)
European Games competitors for Germany
Judoka at the 2015 European Games
Judoka at the 2019 European Games
Judoka at the 2020 Summer Olympics
Medalists at the 2020 Summer Olympics
Olympic medalists in judo
Olympic bronze medalists for Germany
20th-century German people
21st-century German people